Track record is a term from racing, referring either to the best performance of any racehorse or athlete on a certain track, or to the history of a certain racer's past performance.  It is commonly used informally to refer to a person or organization's past performance in any type of endeavor.

Track record may also refer to:
 Track record (horse racing)
Track Records, an English record label
The Track Record, an American pop punk band of the 2000s
It's a New Track Record! (album), a comedy album
Track Record (album), a 1979 compilation album by Sherbet
Track Record, a 1983 compilation album by Joan Armatrading
a record track

For records in track and field see:
United States records in track and field
List of world records in athletics, ratified by the International Association of Athletics Federations. Athletics records comprise the best performances in the sports of track and field, road running and racewalking